The discography of Brad Paisley, an American country music singer, consists of 12 studio albums, three compilation albums, and 46 singles. All but two of Paisley's singles have hit the Top 20 of the Billboard Hot Country Songs charts, with all but six reaching the Top Ten. He has 21 Number Ones, including a streak of ten consecutive, starting with the 2005–06 Dolly Parton duet "When I Get Where I'm Going". When "Waitin' on a Woman", reached number 1 in late 2008, Paisley set a new record for the most consecutive Number Ones (10) by any country artist since the inception of Nielsen SoundScan in 1990. This streak lasted until mid-2009's number 2 single "Welcome to the Future".

Studio albums

1990s and 2000s

2010s

Compilation albums

Singles

1990s and 2000s

2010s and 2020s

Promotional singles

As a featured artist

Other charted songs

Music videos

Miscellaneous appearances

Notes

References

Paisley, Brad
 
 
Discographies of American artists